Stephen Baxter (born 13 November 1957) is an  English hard science fiction author. He has degrees in mathematics and engineering.

Writing style 
Strongly influenced by SF pioneer H. G. Wells, Baxter has been Vice-President of the international H. G. Wells Society since 2006. His fiction falls into three main categories of original work plus a fourth category, extending other authors' writing; each has a different basis, style, and tone.

Baxter's "Future History" mode is based on research into hard science. It encompasses the Xeelee Sequence, which consists of nine novels (including the Destiny's Children trilogy and Vengeance/Redemption duology that is set in alternate timeline), plus three volumes collecting the 52 short pieces (short stories and novellas) in the series, all of which fit into a single timeline stretching from the Big Bang singularity of the past to his Timelike Infinity singularity of the future. These stories begin in the present day and end when the Milky Way galaxy collides with Andromeda five billion years in the future. The central narrative is that of humanity rising and evolving to become the second most powerful race in the universe, next to the god-like Xeelee. Character development tends to be secondary to the depiction of advanced theories and ideas, such as the true nature of the Great Attractor, naked singularities and the great battle between baryonic and dark matter lifeforms. The Manifold Trilogy is another example of Baxter's future history mode, even more conceptual than the Xeelee sequence. Each novel is focused on a potential explanation of the Fermi paradox. The two-part disaster series Flood and Ark (followed by three additional stories, "Earth III," "Earth II," and "Earth I") which also fits into this category, where catastrophic events unfold in the near future and humanity must adapt to survive in three radically different planetary environments. In 2013, Baxter released his short story collection Universes which featured stories set in Flood/Ark, Jones & Bennet and Anti-Ice universes. Baxter signed a contract for two new books, Proxima and Ultima, both of which are names of planets, and they were released in 2013 and 2014, respectively.

A second category in Baxter's work is based on readings in evolutionary biology and human/animal behaviour. Elements of this appear in his future histories (especially later works like the Destiny's Children series and Flood/Ark), but here it is the focus. The major work in this category is Evolution, which imagines the evolution of humanity in the Earth's past and future. The Mammoth Trilogy, written for young adults, shares similar themes and concerns as it explores the present, past, and future of a small herd of mammoths found surviving on an island in the Arctic Ocean.

A third category of Baxter's fiction is alternate history, based on research into history. These stories are more human, with characters portrayed with greater depth and care. This includes his NASA Trilogy, which incorporates research into NASA and its history; and the Time's Tapestry series, which features science-fictional interventions into our past from an alternate-history future. The novel Anti-Ice is an earlier example of Baxter's blending of alternate history with science fiction. A more recent work in this direction is the Northland Trilogy, an alternate prehistory that begins with Stone Spring, set ten thousand years ago in the Stone Age, followed by Bronze Summer and Iron Winter, set in alternate versions of the Bronze Age and the Iron Age. In 2009, Baxter became a judge for the Sidewise Award for Alternate History, the first former winner among the panel.

Another category, outside of the main body of Baxter's independent work, is sequels and installments of science-fiction classics. His first novel to achieve wide recognition (winning three literary awards) was The Time Ships, an authorised sequel to H.G. Wells' The Time Machine. The Time Odyssey series, a trilogy co-authored with Arthur C. Clarke, is connected to Clarke's four Space Odyssey novels. The trilogy consists of Time's Eye, Sunstorm, and Firstborn. Another novel is based on a synopsis written by Clarke, The Light of Other Days. Baxter has also published a Doctor Who novel, The Wheel of Ice. His most recent sequel is The Massacre of Mankind, an authorised sequel to H.G. Wells' The War of the Worlds.

In 2010, Baxter began working on a new series with Terry Pratchett. This collaboration produced five books, The Long Earth, The Long War, The Long Mars, The Long Utopia and The Long Cosmos.

Baxter has written non-fiction essays and columns for such publications as Critical Wave and the British SF Association's Matrix.

Literary awards

Baxter's story "Last Contact" was nominated for the 2008 Hugo Award for best short story.

Personal life
Baxter was born 13 November 1957 in Liverpool, England and studied at St Edward's College, a Catholic grammar school. He then read mathematics at Cambridge University, and obtained a doctorate in engineering at Southampton University, and received an MBA from Henley Management College. Baxter taught maths, physics, and information technology before becoming a full-time author in 1995. He is also a chartered engineer and fellow of the British Interplanetary Society.

Bibliography

References

External links

 
 
 

1957 births
20th-century English novelists
21st-century British novelists
21st-century English novelists
Alumni of Sidney Sussex College, Cambridge
Alumni of the University of Reading
Alumni of the University of Southampton
British alternative history writers
British male short story writers
Schoolteachers from Merseyside
British science fiction writers
English male novelists
English male short story writers
English short story writers
English science fiction writers
Living people
Sidewise Award winners
Writers from Liverpool